Expulsion was a death metal band from Vallentuna, Sweden, that existed from 1988 to 1999. The band gained notability for being one of the earliest Swedish death metal bands, and that two of its members also played in the black metal band Treblinka (later named Tiamat).

History 
In 1988, the thrash metal band River's Edge split up, when lead vocalist Johan Edlund left to form the band Treblinka. Stefan Lagergren (guitar), Anders Holmberg (bass) and Calle Fransson (drums) continued to play together under the name Expulsion and recorded two demo cassettes, Cerebral Cessation (1988) and Veiled in the Mists of Mystery (1989). 

The band went on hold when Holmberg joined Tranquility and was reformed in 1991 by Lagergren and Fransson after leaving Tiamat, together with Fredrik Thörnqvist on vocals and Chelsea Krook on bass. Holmberg returned and replaced Krook on the debut CD EP A Bitter Twist of Fate that was recorded and released by the band themselves (under the record label alias Dödsmetallfirma Expulsion) in 1993.

The debut album Overflow was released in 1994. This album featured guest vocals (on the track At The Madness End) by aforementioned Johan Edlund. The second album Man Against followed in 1996. Although never on any tour, the band played concerts together with bands as At The Gates, Grave, Tiamat, Dismember and Nihilist.

After ten years without any success the band split up in 1998. For a brief period, the members switched vocalist from Thörnqvist to Andreas Jansson under the name Judge And Jury, but ultimately split up in 1999.

Musical style 
On the first two demos, Expulsion "sounded like a thrashier Treblinka", both bands containing Stefan Lagergren and Anders Holmberg and "sound[ing] pretty similar".

Expulsion have often cited the bands Xecutioner, Athetist and Sadus as prime inspirations to start a death metal band. The combination of these influences, and the slower, doomier, bands such as Candlemass and Paradise Lost formed the basis of Expulsion's sound.

Members 
 Stefan Lagergren - guitar (Treblinka, Tiamat, Mr. Death, Voldet)
 Anders Holmberg - bass (also vocals 1988–1991)  (Treblinka, Tiamat, Tranquillity)
 Calle Fransson - drums (Stressfest)
 Fredrik Thörnqvst - vocals 1991–1998
 Chris Vowden - guitar 1992–1999 (Stressfest, Mouthpeace)

Discography

Albums 
 Overflow (1994, Godhead)
 Man Against (1996, Godhead)

EPs 
 A Bitter Twist of Fate (1993, Dödsmetallfirma Expulsion)

Demo cassettes 
 Cerebral Cessation (1988)
 Veiled in the Mists of Mystery (1989)

Compilation albums 
 Certain Corpses Never Decay (2014, Vic Records)

References 

Swedish death metal musical groups
Musical groups established in 1988
Musical groups disestablished in 1999